Herbert Myatt (1884 – 1967) was an English footballer who played for Stoke.

Career
Myatt was born in Stoke-upon-Trent and played amateur football with Stone Town before joining Stoke in 1908. He played for matches for Stoke in 1908–09 scoring twice. He later played for Stafford Rangers.

Career statistics

References

English footballers
Stoke City F.C. players
1884 births
1967 deaths
Stafford Rangers F.C. players
Association football forwards